The 2014 Florida Gators football team represented the University of Florida in the sport of American football during the 2014 NCAA Division I FBS football season. The Gators competed in the Football Bowl Subdivision (FBS) of the National Collegiate Athletic Association (NCAA), and the Eastern Division of the Southeastern Conference (SEC).  They played their home games at Ben Hill Griffin Stadium on the university's campus in Gainesville, Florida.  The 2014 season was the Gators' fourth and final season under head coach Will Muschamp.

On November 16, following an overtime home loss to South Carolina that eliminated the Gators from the SEC East race, Muschamp was informed that he would not return as Florida's head coach in 2015, but he agreed to coach the final two games of the regular season. The Gators became bowl eligible after a win over Eastern Kentucky and dropped Muschamp's last game to Florida State. Under interim coach D.J. Durkin, the Gators won the Birmingham Bowl against East Carolina to finish the season 7–5.  After four seasons, Muschamp compiled a 28–21 overall, 17–15 conference record

Previous season
During the 2013 season, the Gators struggled to a 4–8 record (3–5 in the SEC) in the program's first losing season since  1979.  The Gators also failed to qualify for a bowl game for the first time since being ineligible because of NCAA probation in 1990 and lost to Georgia Southern, marking the Gators' first loss to a current Division I-AA or FCS team since 1946.

Despite calls for the firing of head coach Will Muschamp, Florida athletic director Jeremy Foley opted to bring the coach back for his fourth year, explaining that "I think he has a strong plan, and I think he will fix this."

Pre-season
On April 12, 2014, the Gators played the Orange and Blue game, the program's annual intra-squad spring game. The result was a 23–23 tie, with the Orange team coming back to score a game-tying touchdown and extra point as time expired.  The Orange team was led by quarterbacks Skyler Mornhinweg and highly recruited freshman Will Grier, and the Blue team was led by returning fourth-year junior Jeff Driskel.

Preseason awards
Watch lists
 Maxwell – Jeff Driskel
 Davey O'Brien – Jeff Driskel
 Doak walker – Kelvin Taylor
 Rimington – Max Garcia
 Outland – D. J. Humphries
 Bednarik – Vernon Hargreaves
 Bednarik – Dante Fowler
 Bronko nagurski – Vernon Hargreaves
 Bronko nagurski – Dante Fowler
 Jim thorpe – Vernon Hargreaves
 Walter camp – Vernon Hargreaves
 Lott impact – Vernon Hargreaves
Pre-Season All American teams

Phil Steele
 1st-team – Vernon Hargreaves
 2nd-team – Dante Fowler
 2nd-team – Kyle Christy 
 3rd-team – Jeff Driskel 
 3rd-team – Andre Debose 
 3rd-team – D. J. Humphries 
 4th-team – Kelvin Taylor
 4th-team – Demarcus Robinson 
 4th-team – Antonio Morrison

Lindy's Sports
 1st-team – Vernon Hargreaves
 1st-team – Dante Fowler
 2nd-team – Dante Fowler
 2nd-team – Chaz Green 
 3rd-team – D. J. Humphries 
 3rd-team – Andre Debose
 3rd-team – Kyle Christy

Athlon Sports
 1st-team – Vernon Hargreaves 
 1st-team – Dante Fowler
 2nd-team – Jonathan Bullard  
 3rd-team – Kelvin Taylor
 3rd-team – Andre Debose

Sporting News
 1st-team – Vernon Hargreaves
 2nd-team – Dante Fowler

Media
 1st-team – Dante Fowler 
 1st-team – Vernon Hargreaves III 
 2nd-team – Andre Debose 
 3rd-team – Chaz Green

2014 recruiting class

Team statistics

As of January 3, 2015

Schedule

Source:

The game did not kickoff until 9:50 p.m. due to inclement weather.  The game was again delayed due to lightning after 10 seconds of play during which Florida returned the Idaho kickoff to the Idaho 14-yard line.  The game was called as "suspended" 40 minutes after the second delay due to unsafe field conditions.  The four possible resolutions were (1) resuming the game on a later date (both teams had a bye week on October 25), (2) ending the game with a determined final score, (3) forfeiting the game, or (4) declaring a "no contest" (canceling the game). The athletic directors of both universities decided on September 3 not to reschedule the game, thus declaring it a "no contest." Florida agreed to pay Idaho its promised fee of $975,000 and the schools agreed to schedule a game for the 2018 season.

Game summaries

Eastern Michigan

This game marked the second all-time meeting between Eastern Michigan and Florida, with the first being in 2004 that resulted in a 49–10 Gator win.

Kentucky

This was the SEC conference opener for both teams. This was also the earliest the two teams have played since the SEC split into two divisions in 1992. Florida currently had the longest consecutive and annual active winning streak (27) in NCAA history and longest in-conference streak in Southeastern Conference history over Kentucky, who has not beaten Florida since 1986.  With this win, they extended this winning streak to 28.  This game marked the first overtime game in the Florida–Kentucky series, the first three-overtime game played by Florida, and improves Florida's all-time record in overtime games to 4–2, having won the last four overtime games.

Alabama

Florida and Alabama played for the fourth time in six years, with this matchup being in Tuscaloosa. This is the most-played SEC Championship game as well, with Florida leading that series 4–3. However, Florida trailed the all-time series 14–23, with the last game being played in 2011 that resulted in a 38–10 Alabama win in Gainesville.

Tennessee

In their third SEC game of the 2014 season, Florida squared off against their bitter rival, the Tennessee Volunteers. Both teams have met annually since 1990 and the Volunteers trail the Gators in the all-time series 19–24 (.442), and have lost 9 straight to Florida. In last year's contest in Gainesville, Florida defeated Tennessee 31–17.

LSU

Florida and LSU have been annual opponents since 1971, and forged a heated and evenly matched rivalry since. Florida leads the overall series 31–26–3. The longest winning streak in the series is held by Florida, with nine victories from 1988 to 1996. LSU's longest winning streak is four, from 1977 to 1980. Since 2001, LSU has a 3–3 record at the Swamp, while Florida is 3–3 at Tiger Stadium. Both the Gators and Tigers each won two national championships during that time period and boasted impressive home records against other opponents. In 2013, LSU beat Florida 17–6 in a defensive struggle at Tiger Stadium in Baton Rouge, the first of seven consecutive Gator losses on the year. Florida bested LSU 14–6 in the last matchup in Gainesville in 2012.

Missouri

Florida and Missouri have only played one another 3 total times (1966, 2012, and 2013), but with Missouri joining the SEC Eastern Division in 2012, the two meet annually in both Gainesville and Columbia. 2012 saw Florida squeak by Missouri and earn a share of the SEC East title with a 14–7 win in Gainesville en route to an 11–2 final record. 2013 saw Missouri embarrass Florida (holding them scoreless in the fourth quarter) 36–17 in Columbia en route to an SEC Eastern Division crown and a Cotton Bowl win.

Georgia

In one of only two SEC neutral site games, the Florida–Georgia rivalry is one of the most storied in SEC football. Held in Jacksonville, Florida since 1933 (minus 1994 and 1995) the rivalry attracts huge crowds to Jacksonville, and the associated tailgating and other events earned it the nickname of the "World's Largest Outdoor Cocktail Party." The designated home team alternates from year to year, with ticket distribution split evenly between the fans of the two teams. Georgia holds the overall series lead 49–40–2, and currently is riding a 3-game winning streak heading into this year's matchup. Current Florida head coach Will Muschamp (a former Georgia standout) is 0–7 in the rivalry, losing 4 games as a Georgia player and the last 3 games as Florida head coach. Due to much fan criticism and pressure, Coach Muschamp decided that Treon Harris, the much anticipated freshman, would replace Junior quarterback Jeff Driskel for his first start as a Gator vs the Bulldogs.

Vanderbilt

In one of the more lopsided series in the SEC, Florida travels to Vanderbilt following a rare loss to the Commodores in Gainesville 17–34 in 2013. The win for the Commodores at Florida was the first since 1945. The Commodores snapped a 22-game losing streak to the Gators, and was just the Commodores' 10th win in 47 meetings against the Gators and their first in the series since 1988. Florida leads the overall series with Vanderbilt 35–10–2, and defeated Vanderbilt on their last visit to Nashville in 2012 by a score of 31–17.

South Carolina

Florida and South Carolina have been divisional rivals since 1992, and the Gators holds a dominating 24–7–3 series lead against the Gamecocks. However, the series has been far more evenly matched since the arrival of former Gators Heisman Trophy winning quarterback and former head coach Steve Spurrier as South Carolina Head Coach in 2005. Previously, South Carolina had not defeated Florida since joining the SEC in 1992 before Spurrier's arrival, but has been only a slim 5–4 Florida advantage since. 2013 found Florida narrowly lose 14–19 to South Carolina late in the 4th quarter in a night time match-up at Williams–Brice Stadium in Columbia. During their last visit to Gainesville, South Carolina was dominated on both sides of the ball in a 44–11 Gators rout. This will be the final Southeastern Conference game of the season for both teams. After the game Coach Muschamp was fired and DJ Durkin became the interim coach for the rest of the season.

Eastern Kentucky

Florida closes out the 2014 home season and celebrates Senior Day against FCS opponent Eastern Kentucky. Gators coach Will Muschamp was Eastern Kentucky's secondary coach in 1999 in his second season as a full-time assistant coach. This will be the first meeting between the two teams.

Florida State

In one of the most intense, heated, and emotional rivalries in all of college football, Florida and Florida State ended each of their respective regular seasons against one another in Tallahassee on FSU Senior Day. 2013 found both teams on opposite sides of the coin. FSU went on to an undefeated 14–0 season and were crowned BCS National Champions, while Florida limped to a 4–8 record that included a seven-game losing skid to end the season. Florida holds a 34–22–2 advantage in the series, a 7–3 record since 2004, and has a 4–1 record at Florida State since 2004. Florida State won the most recent match up 37–7 behind eventual Heisman Trophy winner Jameis Winston in Gainesville, while Florida held serve in 2012 by defeating Florida State in Tallahassee 37–26 behind senior running back Mike Gillislee.

East Carolina

This was only the second meeting between the schools.  Their previous meeting came in 1983, a 24-17 Gator victory.  The teams faced each other again in Florida's second game of the 2015 season.

Personnel
Following the low offensive production of the 2013 season, head coach Will Muschamp released offensive coordinator Brent Pease and offensive line coach Tim Davis.  Muschamp replaced Pease with Kurt Roper, who led the Duke Blue Devils to their 1st 10-win season, the ACC title game, and the Chick-fil-A Bowl in 2013.  Muschamp also replaced Davis with Mike Summers, and hired Coleman Hutzler as the new special teams coach.

Roster

Coaching staff

Postseason awards and further accomplishments

Coaches All-SEC
All-SEC First Team:

-Vernon Hargreaves (CB)

All-SEC Second Team:

-Antonio Morrison (LB)

Freshman All-SEC Team:

-Treon Harris (QB)

-Jalen Tabor (CB)

AP All-America
 All-America Second Team: Vernon Hargreaves III

Players drafted into the NFL

References

Florida
Florida Gators football seasons
Birmingham Bowl champion seasons
Florida Gators football